was a Japanese playwright and actor.

Life and career 
Born in Toyooka, Hyōgo Prefecture, Imai was a member of the Ground Self-Defense Force before starting his acting career in the second half of the 1980s. The founder of the stage company Elle Company, he was the author and the main actor of the play The Winds of God, a 1991 drama he successfully performed for about twenty years. Imai was also active in films, TV series and V-Cinema (direct-to-video) releases.

References

External links 
  
 

1961 births
2015 deaths 
Actors from Hyōgo Prefecture
Japanese male film actors 
Japanese male television actors
Japanese male stage actors
20th-century Japanese male actors
21st-century Japanese male actors
Writers from Hyōgo Prefecture